The Crucible of Time is a fix-up science fiction novel by John Brunner. It was first published in 1983.

Serials
Parts 1 and 2 appeared in Isaac Asimov's Science Fiction Magazine as "The Fire is Lit" (Sep 1982) and "Fusing and Refusing" (Jan 1983).

Plot
The novel deals with the efforts of an alien species to escape their homeworld, whose system is passing through a cloud of interstellar debris, resulting in a high rate of in-falling matter. The species' unique biology and their biological technology complicate matters.

Awards
Locus Award 1984, Best SF Novel (13th place)

References

External links

1983 British novels
1983 science fiction novels
Novels by John Brunner
Space opera novels
Works originally published in Asimov's Science Fiction
Random House books
Del Rey books